John Foster Pomeroy (born March 26, 1951) is an American animator who has worked for several major studios, including Walt Disney Animation Studios and Sullivan Bluth Studios. He has also worked as producer, and screenwriter on several animated feature films.

Career 
John Pomeroy started work at Walt Disney Animation Studios in 1973 as a background artist, and became a full animator in 1974 to work on Winnie the Pooh and Tigger Too. While working at Disney, he met fellow animators Don Bluth and Gary Goldman, and began working with them on an independent short film project, Banjo the Woodpile Cat.

In 1979 he, Bluth, Goldman and several other Disney animators left the studio to form the independent studio Don Bluth Productions (later to become Bluth Group), which produced the film The Secret of NIMH and the animation for laserdisc video games Dragon's Lair and Space Ace. The independent studio encountered financial difficulties and declared bankruptcy in 1984, but reformed soon after as Sullivan Bluth Studios and opened a major animation facility in Dublin, Ireland.

Pomeroy remained at the Dublin studio to work as the directing animator and producer on An American Tail and The Land Before Time, before moving back to America in 1989 to form a new US wing of the company.

After working with Sullivan Bluth for thirteen years, Pomeroy was convinced to return to Disney by Don Hahn to work as the supervising animator on John Smith for Pocahontas. While working at Disney, Pomeroy also provided animation for the films Fantasia 2000, The Tigger Movie, Atlantis: The Lost Empire, and Treasure Planet.

Pomeroy then left Disney once again in 2003 during the period where they briefly shut down their traditional animation department and subsequently started to do freelance work and was an animator for Curious George, and most recently, The Simpsons Movie, as well as Tom and Jerry and the Wizard of Oz, Tom and Jerry: The Lost Dragon, Tom and Jerry: Spy Quest, Tom and Jerry: Back to Oz, Tom and Jerry: Willy Wonka and the Chocolate Factory, Space Jam: A New Legacy and Disenchanted.

He is a talented sculptor, and creates busts that animated film artists use to visualize a 3-D model of their character.

John Pomeroy is also a painter of historic events, and builder of historic weapons used in movies.

He is currently on the elders board at a Village Christian School in Sun Valley, California.

Filmography

References

External links 

 

1951 births
Living people
Animators from California
American film producers
American animated film producers
American male painters
Animation screenwriters
Walt Disney Animation Studios people
American storyboard artists
Sullivan Bluth Studios people